The following is a list of the 255 communes of the Vendée department of France.

The communes cooperate in the following intercommunalities (as of 2022):
Communauté d'agglomération Terres de Montaigu
Communauté d'agglomération La Roche-sur-Yon Agglomération
Communauté d'agglomération Les Sables d'Olonne Agglomération
Communauté d'agglomération du Pays de Saint-Gilles-Croix-de-Vie
Communauté de communes Challans-Gois Communauté
Communauté de communes de l'Île de Noirmoutier
Communauté de communes Océan Marais de Monts
Communauté de communes du Pays des Achards
Communauté de communes Pays de Chantonnay
Communauté de communes du Pays de la Châtaigneraie
Communauté de communes Pays de Fontenay-Vendée
Communauté de communes du Pays des Herbiers
Communauté de communes du Pays de Mortagne
Communauté de communes du Pays de Pouzauges
Communauté de communes du Pays de Saint-Fulgent Les Essarts
Communauté de communes Sud Vendée Littoral
Communauté de communes Vendée Grand Littoral
Communauté de communes Vendée, Sèvre, Autise
Communauté de communes de Vie et Boulogne

References

Vendee